The Freewill Shakespeare Festival (known as the River City Shakespeare Festival from 1998–2009) is produced by The Free Will Players Theatre Guild (FWP) in Edmonton and is one of the longest running outdoor Shakespeare Festivals in Canada. FWP was formed as a not-for-profit theatre company in 1989 by a group of seven recent graduates of the U of A in a truly cooperative, pass-the-hat spirit with the mandate to produce the works of William Shakespeare. Since then, FWP has grown to an organization that employs over 50 artists, administrators, and support staff at the height of the summer season of plays and has drawn over 250,000 people to its productions. In addition, the summer season down at the Heritage Amphitheatre in Hawrelak Park also has over 150 volunteers assisting with the afternoon and evening shows and special events. These volunteers put in over 4000 hours each summer. In 2019 FWP celebrated its 30th anniversary!

FWP’s seasons consist of two fully realized Shakespearean productions that play in repertory over 4 weeks from late June to late July. Productions boast contemporary interpretations of setting, theme, and character to best communicate the plays ideas for a modern audience. Some seasons have also included ancillary events such as an off-site secondary production, guest productions, puppet shows, and Camp Shakespeare. FWP endeavours to make the productions accessible to all audiences, regardless of age, ability, education or income levels, while also developing new audiences and mentoring theatre professionals of the future. In the spirit of the original artists’ ‘pass the hat’ philosophy FWP continues encouraging audiences with Pay-What-You-Will and special pricing for students and seniors.

Due to significant damage to Freewill's traditional venue at the Heritage Amphitheatre, the festival's 2014 season took place inside the Myer Horowitz Theatre in the University of Alberta's Students' Union Building (8900 114 Street).

Recent productions

References

External links
Official website: Information on the festival's history and the Free Will Players

Theatre festivals in Alberta
Shakespeare festivals in Canada
Festivals in Edmonton
Summer festivals
Festivals established in 1989
1989 establishments in Alberta